Haplolobus kapitensis is a species of plant in the Burseraceae family. It is a tree endemic to Borneo.

References

kapitensis
Endemic flora of Borneo
Trees of Borneo
Vulnerable plants
Taxonomy articles created by Polbot